Sankt Oswald is a town located in the district of Melk within  the Austrian state of Lower Austria.

Population

References

Cities and towns in Melk District